My Boyfriend's Back is the second studio album released by the American pop girl group the Angels. It was issued on the Smash Records label in September 1963. The album was produced by Robert Feldman, Jerry Goldstein, and Richard Gottehrer. It features the Angels' biggest hit, "My Boyfriend's Back", which reached number one on the Billboard Hot 100. Composed by the team of Bob Feldman, Jerry Goldstein, and Richard Gottehrer, "My Boyfriend's Back" sold over one million copies, and was awarded a gold disc.

Peggy Santiglia was by this time the lead singer of the Angels but included on the album is the group's first hit "Till" which was originally recorded in 1961 with the group's previous lead singer, Linda Jansen. It is unspecified if the track was re-recorded with Santiglia on lead or not. There is also a cover version of The Chiffons' "He's So Fine" as The Chiffons had covered "My Boyfriend's Back," and a reading of "Someday My Prince Will Come" from the 1937 film Snow White and the Seven Dwarfs. The album sold fairly well and charted at number 33 on the US Billboard 200 Albums chart, the group's most successful effort.

Track listing

Side 1
"My Boyfriend's Back" (Bob Feldman, Jerry Goldstein, Richard Gottehrer) – 2:13
"Someday My Prince Will Come" (Frank Churchill, Larry Morey) – 2:23
"Has Anybody Seen My Boyfriend" (Feldman, Goldstein, Marty Sanders, Gottehrer) – 2:00
"'Til" (Carl Sigman, Charles Danvers) – 2:30
"The Night Has a Thousand Eyes" (Benjamin Weisman, Dorothy Wayne, Marilyn Garrett) – 2:26
"Why Don't the Boy Leave Me Alone" (Robert Spencer) – 2:08

Side 2
"He's So Fine" (Ronnie Mack) – 1:51
"Thank You and Goodnight" (Feldman, Goldstein, Sanders, Gottehrer) – 2:30
"The Hurdy-Gurdy Man" (Feldman, Goldstein, Gottehrer) – 2:30
"World Without Love" (Feldman, Goldstein, Gottehrer) – 2:21
"(Love Me) Now" (Feldman, Goldstein, Gottehrer) – 1:53
"The Guy with the Black Eye" (Feldman, Goldstein, Gottehrer, Robert Kalina) – 2:23

Personnel
Peggy Santiglia - lead vocals
Barbara Allbut - backing vocals
Phyllis Allbut - backing vocals
Patricia Bennett, Barbara Lee, and Sylvia Peterson - backing vocals on "He's So Fine"

Singles history
"My Boyfriend's Back" b/w "(Love Me) Now" (U.S. #1)
"Thank You and Goodnight" (U.S. #84)

References

External links
 [ Allmusic Link]
 [ The Angels Biography at Allmusic]

1963 albums
Smash Records albums
The Angels (American group) albums